Non Sombun  is a tambon (subdistrict) located in the southern region of Det Udom District, in Ubon Ratchathani Province, Thailand. In 2021, it had a population of 5,993 people. Neighbouring subdistricts are (clockwise from the south) Kaeng, Na Kasem, Som Sa-at, Tha Pho Si, and Top Hu.

History
The tambon was formed in 1993, by splitting off nine villages in the northern region of Kaeng.

Geography
The tambon is located in the southern region of the Det Udom district, on the undulating land alongside the low river plain of the Lam Dom Yai River, with a tropical savanna climate.

Administration
The Non Sombun subdistrict is divided into nine administrative villages (mubans; หมู่บ้าน). The entire area is governed by the Subdistrict Administrative Organization of Non Sombun (องค์การบริหารส่วนตำบลโนนสมบูรณ์; Non Sombun SAO).

As of the 2021 census, it had a population of 5,993 people with 2,066 households. The following is a list of the subdistrict's mubans, which roughly correspond to the villages.

References

Tambon of Ubon Ratchathani Province